Walked All Night Long is an album recorded by blues artists Louisiana Red & Lefty Dizz in 1976, and released on CD in 1997.
The CD contains 15 tracks, 10 of which are original tracks written or co-written by Louisiana Red. Red handles all the lead vocals, as well as guitar and harmonica. Dizz plays lead guitar. Kyril Bromley plays piano on tracks 7, 13 & 15.

Track listing
"First Degree" – 3:20 - Louisiana Red & Kent Cooper
"Bring My Machine Gun" – 4:40 - Louisiana Red
"King Bee" – 2:33 - James Moore (Slim Harpo)
"Stole From Me" – 2:53 - Kent Cooper
"Too Poor To Die" – 2:54 - Louisiana Red
"Walked All Night Long" – 2:35 - Louisiana Red
"Cold White Sheet" – 6:08 - Louisiana Red & Kent Cooper
"Pinetop" – 4:43 - Louisiana Red
"Going Train Blues" – 4:50 - Kent Cooper & Don Johnson
"I'll Pay The Price" – 3:11 - Kent Cooper
"Going Down Georgia" – 3:16 - Louisiana Red
"Ever Heard A Churchbell Sound" – 3:39 - Traditional
"Mary" – 4:57 - Louisiana Red
"Got A Gal With A Dog Won't Bark" – 3:18 - Louisiana Red
"The Whole World" – 4:41 - Louisiana Red & Kent Cooper

References

Blues albums by American artists